The Skadar–Peć Fault is a fault in Albania and Kosovo. It strikes NE–SW between the cities of Shkodër and Peć. The fault marks the southern limit of the external nappes of the Dinarides, which crop out in the north-west. In the south-east the fault borders the internal nappes of the Dinarides.

References

Geology of Albania
Plate tectonics
Geology of Kosovo
Seismic faults of Europe